Turaga (Kaitag and Dargwa: Турагъа) is a rural locality (a selo) in Kirkinsky Selsoviet, Kaytagsky District, Republic of Dagestan, Russia. The population was 57 as of 2010.

Geography 
Turaga is located 31 km southwest of Madzhalis (the district's administrative centre) by road. Kirki and Kuzhnik are the nearest rural localities.

Nationalities 
Dargins live there.

References 

Rural localities in Kaytagsky District